Saxer is a surname of German origin meaning "of Saxony". Notable people with the surname include:

Mary Saxer (born 1987), American pole vaulter
Walter Saxer, producer and screenwriter of Scream of Stone

See also
Saxer Brewing Company, American brewer now owned by Portland Brewing Company
Saxer Avenue (SEPTA Route 101 station), trolleybus stop in Pennsylvania

German-language surnames